Michael Tannousis (born December 8, 1983) is an American attorney and politician who is a member of the New York State Assembly from the 64th district. He was elected in 2020 to a term which began on January 1, 2021.

Early life and education 
Tannousis was born and raised on Staten Island, the son of immigrants from Cyprus. Tannousis attended Monsignor Farrell High School, then earned a Bachelor of Arts degree in political science from Binghamton University and a Juris Doctor from the Pace University School of Law.

Career 
After law school, Tannousis worked as a prosecutor in Staten Island and The Bronx. He also served as a counselor to City Councilman Joe Borelli. After Nicole Malliotakis announced that she would not seek re-election to the New York State Assembly and instead run for the United States House of Representatives, Tannousis declared his candidacy to succeed her. Tannousis defeated Marko Kepi in the Republican primary and Democratic nominee Brandon Patterson in the November general election.

References 

Living people
Politicians from Staten Island
Lawyers from New York City
Binghamton University alumni
Pace University School of Law alumni
Republican Party members of the New York State Assembly
American people of Cypriot descent
1983 births